KKGU (90.1 FM) was a non-commercial FM radio station owned and operated by Hurao, Inc. Licensed to Hagåtña, Guam, it aired a full service format.

The station was assigned the KKGU call letters by the Federal Communications Commission (FCC) on February 6, 2014.

KKGU's licensee Hurao, Inc. surrendered the station's license to the FCC on October 29, 2021, who cancelled it on November 1, 2021.

References

External links
 
 

Radio stations in Guam
Radio stations established in 2014
2014 establishments in Guam
Radio stations disestablished in 2021
2020s disestablishments in Guam
Full service radio stations in the United States
Hagåtña, Guam